Tamanna (English: Desire or Aim in Life) is an Indian Hindi television soap opera which aired on Star Plus from 1 February 2016 to 26 June 2016.

It follows the journey of Dharaa who aspires to become a cricketer, breaking the norms of her family and society with her father's support.

Synopsis
The story revolves around Dharaa who wants to become a cricketer and the sacrifices she has to make in order to achieve her dream. Dharaa is supported by her father and soon convinces her grandmother about playing cricket. She continues playing well and a promising future seemed to lie ahead. But the sudden deterioration of her father's health convinces her to agree to marry Mihir soon, a guy with whom her alliance was going to be fixed. She is initially happy and continues playing cricket, but soon realises her husband's chauvinistic side. He treats Dharaa like a prisoner and controls her. He even went to the extent of doubting her character, and feels that Shubhangi, his and Dharaa's daughter, is not his but Diwakar's, his boss and their neighbour. Fed up of Mihir's possessive nature and insulting behaviour, Dharaa divorces Mihir.

After that M.N.Roy gives Dharaa a job as a cricket coach in a school in Merut. Seeing the bitterness between the Hindu and Muslim students she decides to first make one single team and she succeeds in it but because of a little war between the two players Sanjay and Salamat causes riots again in Bulandganj. She decides to resign but the students apologize to her and then she starts to coach them again. Mihir arrives in Bulandganj and is gathering evidences to portray Dharaa as an irresponsible mother to gain Shubhangi's custody. But Dharaa convinces the judge of her capability of single-parenting alongside her coaching. Mihir then realises his mistake and walks away. Bhanu Pratap and Khan conspire to make riots and assault Bashir and kill Gafur but later get arrested. During this Sanjay and Salamat become friends, and Mridula gives birth to a baby boy at the same time. Dharaa's team gets selected in the tournament and they slog hard and win the trophy. Mihir comes back to Dharaa but Dharaa turns him down and returns to Jamnagar.

Cast
 Anuja Sathe as Dharaa Solanki 
 Harshita Ojha as Young Dharaa
 Deepak Wadhwa as Sanjay Pratap Singh
Ram Kapoor as Avinash Arora 
 Vishal Gandhi as Mihir Shukhadia: Dharaa's ex-husband
 Ketki Dave as Baa
 Kiran Karmarkar as Deepak Solanki: Dharaa's father
 Ruchi Savarn as Mridula: Dharaa Friend, Sameer's wife
 Sailesh Gulabani as Sameer: Mridula's husband
 Rajlaxmi Solanki as Dharaa's mother
 Ashish Vidyarthi as young Dharaa's coach
 Harsh Chhaya as Coach Roy
 Seema Deo as Roy's mother
 Nimisha Vakharia as Mihir's mother
 Hitesh Rawal as Vijay Agnihotri: Mihir's father
 Sudhanshu Pandey as Diwakar Limaye: Mihir's New Boss
 Anchal Sabharwal as Lavanya
 Rajesh Khera as Advocate
 Rohit Chande as Imran
 Pankaj Berry as Bhanu Pratap
 Raju Kher as the school principal
 Anang Desai as Pandit Chaurasia
 Bhavin Bhanushali as Bashir Khan
 Himanshu Arora as Arjun Singh
 Tushaar Bhan as Balram
 Tashvi Thakker as Shubhangi: Dharaa's daughter
 Aarav Mavi as Amir
 Gurpreet Valiya as Sultan 
 Jayesh Kardak as Veer
 Vijay Raval as Razaq
 Miraj Joshi as Virat Sharma
 Saurabh Pratap as Parvez
 Shankar Sachdev as Mishra 
 Prithvi Zutshi as Teacher
 Shishir Sharma as Coach at Mumbai
 Unknown as Gaffur

Guests
 Sonali Kulkarni as Dharaa's Advocate
 Kiran More as himself

Production 
The series was launched on 21 January 2016 in Mumbai.

Before its premiere, initially titled as Badal Pe Paun Hai, later was renamed as Tamanna due to astrological reason.

The story is set in Jamnagar, Gujarat. The series was filmed in Gujarat and Mumbai. It was a planned finite series which was expected to end on May, but popular demand paved way for its extension till June.

The title track was composed by Suhail Zargar.

Reception
In March 2016, Daily News and Analysis, in their list of 10 female characters of Indian television who stand out progressive, included the lead character Dhara among others stating her ambition as unique.

Hindustan Times stated the story as refreshing and criticised, "The narrative and pace of the show, which took a while to reach the crux of the story."

External links
 Official Website

References

2016 Indian television series debuts
2016 Indian television series endings
StarPlus original programming
Indian drama television series
Indian sports television series
Cricket on television